Patrick Martin Cusack (born 2 July 1954), known by the stage name Pete Briquette, is an Irish bassist, record producer and composer. He is a member of the Boomtown Rats and has also played in Bob Geldof's band.

Boomtown Rats
He was born in Ballyjamesduff, County Cavan, Ireland. His stage name refers to his upbringing in Ireland where peat briquettes were burned for heat instead of coal.

He is the bass guitarist, backing vocalist, occasional songwriter, and sometime keyboardist for The Boomtown Rats, a band that reached worldwide popularity in the late 1970s. His bass lines are evident on such Boomtown Rats songs as "Rat Trap", "Banana Republic" and "Like Clockwork", the last two of which he co-wrote with Bob Geldof. Briquette was the only Rats member who frequently collaborated with Geldof as a solo artist, playing on some of his biggest hits such as "Great Song of Indifference" and "Love or Something".

Record producer
Briquette also works as a record producer and produced the French singer Renaud's 2009 album of Irish ballads Molly Malone - Balade Irlandaise which includes contributions from Terry Woods (The Pogues), Barney McKenna (The Dubliners) and Glen Hansard. Though criticised for the quality of Renaud's voice, the album was commercially successful reaching number one on the French chart.

Personal life
Briquette is a first cousin of Johnnie Fingers, the main keyboardist in the Boomtown Rats, as their mothers, Margaret "Peggy" (Bowles) Cusack and Cecilia "Sheila" (Bowles) Moylett, were sisters. They are nephews of Irish  conductor and composer Michael Bowles. He currently lives in Acton, London, England.

References

External links
A list of some of Briquette's recent projects

Irish bass guitarists
Irish male songwriters
Musicians from County Cavan
The Boomtown Rats members
Irish new wave musicians
Living people
People from Ballyjamesduff
1954 births